Kathy Boudin (May 19, 1943 – May 1, 2022) was an American radical leftist who served 23 years in prison for felony murder based on her role in the 1981 Brink's robbery. The robbery resulted in the killing of two Nyack, New York, police officers and one security guard, and serious injury to another security guard. Boudin was a founding member of the militant Weather Underground organization, which engaged in bombings of government buildings to express opposition to U.S. foreign policy and racism. She was released on parole in 2003 and after earning a doctorate became an adjunct professor at Columbia University.

Early life and family
Kathy Boudin was born in Manhattan on May 19, 1943, into a Jewish family with a storied left-wing history. She was raised in Greenwich Village, New York City. Her paternal grandparents had emigrated from Russia and Austria. Her great-uncle was Marxist theorist Louis B. Boudin, while her brother is conservative U.S. Judge Michael Boudin. Her mother was poet Jean (Roisman) Boudin, whose sister Esther was married to radical journalist I.F. Stone (making him Kathy's uncle). Her father, attorney Leonard Boudin, had represented controversial clients such as Judith Coplon, the Cuban government, and Paul Robeson. A National Lawyers Guild attorney, Leonard Boudin was the law partner of Victor Rabinowitz, himself counsel to numerous left-wing organizations. Kathy Boudin graduated from Bryn Mawr College in 1965 as class valedictorian. After college, she attended Case Western law school for one year.

Boudin met her romantic partner, David Gilbert, in the 1970s and gave birth to their son Chesa Boudin in 1980. When her son was 14 months old, she was arrested and subsequently convicted and incarcerated for felony murder based on her role as a decoy in the 1981 Brink's robbery. Her son was raised by former Weatherman leaders Bill Ayers and Bernardine Dohrn.

Weather Underground

In 1969, Boudin was a founding member of the Weatherman faction of Students for a Democratic Society, which in 1970 became the Weather Underground Organization (WUO). In 1970 she and Cathy Wilkerson were the only survivors of the Greenwich Village townhouse explosion, when a bomb that their comrades were constructing in the basement, intending to use it to attack U.S. Army personnel that evening, exploded prematurely, killing three of the militants and demolishing the building they were using as a hideout and bomb factory. The WUO soon after renounced actions that sought to inflict human casualties. Boudin remained a fugitive for more than a decade, engaging in multiple additional bombings (none of which resulted in injuries) and other actions. 

In 1981, Boudin and several former members of the Weather Underground, with current members of the May 19th Communist Organization and the Black Liberation Army, robbed a Brink's armored car at the Nanuet Mall, in Nanuet, New York. Boudin was in the front seat of a U-Haul truck used as a switchcar getaway vehicle and also acted as a decoy. Responding police testified that when they spotted and pulled over the getaway vehicle, Boudin feigned innocence and encouraged the two responding officers put their guns down. Her accomplices leaped from the back of the truck and shot officers Edward O'Grady and Waverly Brown, killing them. In addition to the deaths of O'Grady and Brown, the robbers severely wounded guard Joseph Trombino; killed his partner, Peter Paige; and injured two other police officers.

Guilty plea and incarceration
Boudin was arrested while attempting to flee the scene on foot. She eventually pleaded guilty to felony murder and robbery for an agreed sentence of 20 years to life in prison. While incarcerated, Boudin published articles in the Harvard Educational Review ("Participatory Literacy Education Behind Bars: AIDS Opens the Door," Summer 1993, 63 (2)), in Breaking the Rules: Women in Prison and Feminist Therapy by Judy Harden and Marcia Hill ("Lessons from a Mother's Program in Prison:  A Psychosocial Approach Supports Women and Their Children," published simultaneously in Women & Therapy, 21), and in Breaking the Walls of Silence:  AIDS and Women in a New York State Maximum-Security Prison. She co-authored The Foster Care Handbook for Incarcerated Parents published by Bedford Hills in 1993.  She also co-edited Parenting from inside/out: Voices of mothers in prison, jointly published by correctional institutions and the Osborne Association. Boudin also co-founded AIDS Committee for Education (ACE) inside the prison in 1988 with other incarcerated women including Katrina Haslip and Judith Alice Clark to provide accurate education on living with HIV.

Boudin also wrote and published poetry while incarcerated, publishing in books and journals including the PEN Center Prize Anthology Doing Time, Concrete Garden, and Aliens at the Border.  She won an International PEN prize for her poetry in 1999.

Boudin and Roslyn D. Smith contributed the piece "Alive Behind the Labels: Women in Prison" to the 2003 anthology Sisterhood Is Forever: The Women's Anthology for a New Millennium, edited by Robin Morgan.

After almost 23 years' imprisonment, Boudin was granted parole on August 20, 2003, in her third parole hearing. She was released from the Bedford Hills Correctional Facility on September 18, 2003.

Life after prison
After her release from prison, Boudin accepted a job in the HIV/AIDS Clinic at St. Luke's-Roosevelt Hospital Center, meeting the work provisions of parole that required active job prospects.

In May 2004 Boudin published an essay in the Fellowship of Reconciliation's publication Fellowship, expressing remorse for her participation in the Brink's robbery, which she described as "horrific."  Subsequently, she received an Ed. D. from Columbia University Teachers College. In addition to her work at St. Luke's-Roosevelt, Boudin worked as a consultant to Osborne Association in the development of a Longtermers Responsibility Project taking place in the New York State Correctional Facilities, utilizing a restorative practice approach, and co-authored the Coming to Terms curriculum used in the program. She also consulted for Vermont Corrections and the Women's Prison Association and supervised social workers.

Columbia University
Boudin was named an adjunct professor at the Columbia University School of Social Work, where she was the co-director and co-founder of the Center for Justice at Columbia University. Her appointment was controversial due to her guilty plea to a felony murder charge and her past participation in a group which carried out terrorist attacks in the United States. However, an opinion piece in the Columbia Daily Spectator noted that she took responsibility for her crimes and successfully rehabilitated herself. Columbia School of Social Work Associate Dean Marianne Yoshioka, who hired Boudin for the adjunct-professor post in 2008, was quoted as saying that Boudin has been "an excellent teacher who gets incredible evaluations from her students each year."  In 2013, she was Sheinberg Scholar-in-Residence at New York University School of Law. The law school has maintained a video of her lecture.

In popular culture
Boudin was a model for the title role in David Mamet's play The Anarchist (2012). She also was a model for Willy Holtzman's Off-Broadway play Something You Did (2008).  Boudin was an inspiration for the character Merry in Philip Roth's American Pastoral.

Death
On May 1, 2022, Boudin died in New York City at the age of 78, a day after returning from a visit to San Francisco. According to her son Chesa Boudin, who was serving as District Attorney of San Francisco, Boudin had been battling cancer for seven years.

References

Further reading
New York Times – Topics: Kathy Boudin collected news stories including commentary and archival articles since 1983
The New York Times; October 1, 2006; It has been a quarter-century since a group of self-styled freedom fighters, including Judith A. Clark, carried out an armored-car robbery in Rockland County, New York. The holdup was a final eruption of Vietnam-era extremism and a shattering event for Rockland County, which lost two local police officers and a Brinks guard.
The New York Times; September 6, 2003; Housing Complicates Boudin's Release. When Kathy Boudin was granted parole last month after 22 years in prison for her role in a 1981 armored-car robbery and shootout that left three dead, her supporters thought it would be just a matter of days before she gained freedom.
 Letter from Kathy Boudin '65 Bryn Mawr alumnae bulletin, letter written in 2001 after she had been incarcerated for 19 years
 Elizabeth Kolbert, "The Prisoner" The New Yorker, July 16, 2001
 Editorial, "Kathy Boudin's Time" The Nation, September 15, 2003
 Review of Family Circle  The Nation, January 5, 2004
"A Family Circle From Hell" 26 Thomas Jefferson Law Review 409 (2004), a review written by Arthur Austin
 Abby Luby, "Kathy Boudin's Impact" Bedford Record-Review, September 2005
 
 Family Circle: The Boudins and the Aristocracy of the Left by Susan Braudy, Anchor, 2004, 
 

1943 births
2022 deaths
1981 in New York (state)
1981 murders in the United States
20th-century American criminals
American bank robbers
American female criminals
American female murderers
American people convicted of murdering police officers
American people convicted of robbery
American people of Austrian-Jewish descent
American people of Russian-Jewish descent
Boudin family
Bryn Mawr College alumni
COINTELPRO targets
Columbia University faculty
Deaths from cancer in New York (state)
Members of the Weather Underground
People from Greenwich Village
Teachers College, Columbia University alumni